The third season of Top Chef Brasil premiered on Friday, September 24, 2021 at  (BRT / AMT) on RecordTV.

Contestants
Source:

Contestant progress

Key

Main guest appearances 
Episode 2
  Chef Dagoberto Torres
Episode 4
  Chef Mara Salles
Episode 7
 Adriane Galisteu
Episode 8
 Arnaldo Lorençato
 Patrícia Ferraz

Ratings and reception

Brazilian ratings
All numbers are in points and provided by Kantar Ibope Media.

References

External links
 Tof Chef Brasil 3 on R7.com

2021 Brazilian television seasons
Brasil, Season 3